Shaun, Shawn or Sean Collins may refer to:

Sportsmen
Shawn Collins (born 1967), American football player
Sean Collins (ice hockey forward, born 1983), American player drafted by Colorado Avalanche
Sean Collins (ice hockey defenseman) (born 1983), American player for Washington Capitals
Sean Collins (ice hockey, born 1988), Canadian player for Columbus Blue Jackets and Washington Capitals

Others
Seán Collins (politician) (1918–1975), Irish Fine Gael TD 1948–1957 and 1961–1969
Sean Collins (surf forecaster) (1952–2011), American founder of Surfline
Shaun Collins, South African guitarist and lyricist; Cutting Jade#Members in 1998

See also
John Collins (disambiguation)
Shane Collins (disambiguation)